Gerardo Gabriel Galindo Martínez (born 23 May 1978) is a Mexican former professional footballer who plays as a defensive midfielder.

Playing career

Club
Gerardo debuted in a victory 1–0 over Atlante. El Jerry was a vital part in UNAM Pumas 2 championships in a row in 2004. Although debuting in 1997, it was in 2001 when he gained a starting spot in Pumas.

International
Being a starter and a trustworthy player in Hugo Sánchez's coaching career in Pumas, he has also been called to play with Mexico, such as qualification games for the 2006 FIFA World Cup.

Managerial career
In 2013, after being diagnosed with cancer, Galindo had treatments to remove a tumor. The tumor returned months later, thus forcing Galindo into retirement. In 2017, Galindo joined former UNAM teammate Jaime Lozano, to be an assistant coach at Queretaro FC.

Honours
UNAM Pumas
 Mexican Torneo de Clausura (2004)
 Mexican Torneo de Apertura (2004)
Club de Futbol Monterrey
 Mexican Torneo de Apertura (2009)

See also
List of people from Morelos, Mexico

References

External links
 Career stats at FootballDatabase.com
 
 espndeportes.espn.go.com

1978 births
Living people
Sportspeople from Cuernavaca
Footballers from Morelos
Association football midfielders
Mexico international footballers
2005 CONCACAF Gold Cup players
Club Universidad Nacional footballers
Club Necaxa footballers
C.F. Monterrey players
Club Tijuana footballers
Tecos F.C. footballers
Liga MX players
Mexican footballers